Abudwak District is a district in central Galguduud region of Somalia.

References

External links
 Administrative map of Abudwak District

Districts of Somalia

Galguduud